Al Eschbach is an American radio personality.

He has had a radio program on WWLS radio since 1985.

Early life and education
He was raised in Jersey City, New Jersey.

He went to Seton Hall Prep for high school and then University of Oklahoma.

Career
In 1976, he started his career as the sports director at KTOK in Oklahoma City.

Awards and honors
He was inducted into the Oklahoma Journalism Hall of Fame in 2020.

References

External links
Al Eschbach

American sports radio personalities
University of Oklahoma alumni
Seton Hall Preparatory School alumni
Living people
Year of birth missing (living people)